Fabio Tempestivi (also Fabio Tempestivo)(died 1616) was a Roman Catholic prelate who served as Archbishop of Dubrovnik (1602–1616).

Biography
On 12 August 1602, Fabio Tempestivi  was appointed during the papacy of Pope Clement VIII as Archbishop of Dubrovnik.
On 25 August 1602, he was consecrated bishop by Domenico Pinelli, Cardinal-Priest of Santa Maria in Trastevere, with Paolo Alberi, Archbishop Emeritus of Dubrovnik, and Leonard Abel, Titular Bishop of Sidon, serving as co-consecrators. 
He served as Archbishop of Dubrovnik until his death in 1616. While bishop, he was the principal co-consecrator of Gerolamo Mezzamico, Bishop of Trevico.

References

External links and additional sources
 (for Chronology of Bishops) 
 (for Chronology of Bishops) 

17th-century Roman Catholic archbishops in the Republic of Venice
Bishops appointed by Pope Clement VIII
1616 deaths